The Music from Peter Gunn is a soundtrack album to the TV series Peter Gunn, composed and conducted by Henry Mancini, and released in 1959 on RCA Victor. It was the first album ever to win the Grammy Award for Album of the Year in 1959. The album was followed by More Music from Peter Gunn, also released on RCA Victor in 1959.

The opening theme music is notable for its combination of jazz orchestration with a straightforward rock 'n roll beat. In his autobiography Did They Mention the Music? Mancini stated:
The Peter Gunn title theme actually derives more from rock and roll than from jazz. I used guitar and piano in unison, playing what is known in music as an ostinato, which means obstinate. It was sustained throughout the piece, giving it a sinister effect, with some frightened saxophone sounds and some shouting brass. The piece has one chord throughout and a super-simple top line.

The Music from Peter Gunn was selected by the Library of Congress as a 2010 addition to the National Recording Registry, which selects recordings annually that are "culturally, historically, or aesthetically significant".

Track listings
The Music from Peter Gunn (1959) (RCA Victor LPM/LSP-1956)
 "Peter Gunn"  – 2:06
 "Sorta Blue"  – 2:57
 "The Brothers Go to Mother's"  – 2:56
 "Dreamsville"  – 3:51
 "Session at Pete's Pad"  – 3:57
 "Soft Sounds"  – 3:35
 "Fallout!"  – 3:13
 "The Floater"  – 3:15
 "Slow and Easy"  – 3:04
 "A Profound Gass"  – 3:18
 "Brief and Breezy"  – 3:31
 "Not from Dixie"  – 4:09

More Music from Peter Gunn (1959)
 "Walkin' Bass" – 4:20
 "Timothy" – 2:35
 "Joanna" – 2:39
 "My Manne Shelly" – 2:35
 "Goofin' At The Coffee House" – 4:09
 "Odd Ball" – 3:22
 "Blue Steel" – 3:39
 "The Little Man Theme" – 3:12
 "Spook!" – 2:55
 "A Quiet Gass" – 3:01
 "Lightly" – 3:21
 "Blues For Mother's" – 3:16

Personnel
Musicians vary from song to song, but include:
 
Pete Candoli, Ray Linn, Frank Beach, Uan Rasey, Conrad Gozzo - trumpet
Dick Nash, Jimmy Priddy, Milt Bernhart, Karl DeKarske - trombone
John Graas, Vincent DeRosa, Richard Perissi, John Cave - French horn
Ted Nash, Plas Johnson, Ronny Lang, Paul Horn, Gene Cipriano - reeds
John Williams - piano
Bob Bain, Al Hendrickson - guitar
Victor Feldman, Larry Bunker - vibraphone
Rolly Bundock - bass
Shelly Manne, Alvin Stoller, Jack Sperling - drums

Certifications

References

 

1959 soundtrack albums
Henry Mancini albums
Buddah Records soundtracks
Grammy Hall of Fame Award recipients
United States National Recording Registry recordings
Television soundtracks
RCA Victor soundtracks
Grammy Award for Album of the Year
United States National Recording Registry albums